Stenolechia rectivalva is a moth of the family Gelechiidae. It is found in Japan (Honshu).

The length of the forewings is 3.5-4.2 mm. The forewings are white, scattered with fuscous scales, also with yellowish scales on the discal area and dark fuscous markings, consisting of three large blackish spots on the costa, two medium-sized blackish spots beneath the base of the fold and above the distal end of the fold, two small blackish spots on the fold, as well as a blackish spot on the discal area and some yellowish spots on the discal area.

References

Moths described in 1984
Stenolechia